Ashur Bet Sargis (born July 2, 1949) is an Assyrian singer, composer, guitarist and activist. He became famous in the Assyrian communities worldwide for his nationalistic songs in the 1970s. His career peaked, and became prominent, in the 1990s with five albums released within that decade. His songs usually tend to be sentimental ballads and anthems, although he has made many folk dance music as well. To the contrast of his Assyrian peers in music, Sargis's music is slow and mellow. He is also known for incorporating Greek instruments such as the tambouras into his music.

Early career in Iraq
Ashur Bet Sargis was born in Baghdad, Iraq to an Assyrian family who was originally from Habbaniyah. He started playing the organ as a teenager at the local Assyrian church. He later began composing nationalistic songs under the influence of established Assyrian musicians such as Evin Aghassi and King Biba, as well as western artists. As Sargis recalls of his early days in the biography written for his album Everything So Far:

Rise to fame
Shortly after the Ba'ath-led revolution of 1968, Sargis fled the unstable political situation in Iraq in 1969, ending up in Chicago, United States. A year later he formed his first band, "East Bird Band", which released its first recording in 1972. He relocated to Los Angeles in 1973 and in 1975 released his first LP Ashur Sargis Sings for Ancient Assyria which contained nationalistic songs like "Roosh Jwanqa" and "Bet Nahren Atrewa", written by Benyamin Mako, as well as several other songs that have since become staples of his catalog and concerts.

In 1976, Sargis became the first Assyrian artist to tour overseas when he and his band played three sold-out shows in Australia. Soon afterward he would travel to Iran, which at that time had the second largest population of Assyrians in the Middle East, and had long been a large producer of Assyrian music on the record labels that flourished in Tehran in the days before the Islamic Revolution. After two weeks of performances there, he returned to Los Angeles to record his third album, Sing Me a Lullaby. He followed it with Dance of Victory in 1984.

Later years
Sargis is known for his staunch support for Zowaa and has composed several songs for the party. He also returned to Northern Iraq many times where he gave many concerts during Kha b-Nisan, before the Iraq War. He is often featured at Zowaa-sponsored festivals in the Nineveh Plains and the Dohuk Governorate. Sargis currently resides in Los Angeles, California.

Discography

 1972 – Bet Nahren ("Mesopotamia")
 1975 – Ancient Assyria ( Atour Atiqa)
 1979 – Sing Me a Lullaby (Tanili Lay Lay)
 1984 – Dance of Victory (Riqda d'Ghaliboota)
 1990 – Winter Wind (Pokha d'Sitwa)
 1992 – The Mighty Assyrians 
 1995 – Mirror of Deception(Nora Aldyana)
 1996 – From a Distant World ( Ana Lewin Min Daha Dunyeh)
 1998 – Immortal Memories (Zmaryeta d'Khoba Mtomaya)
 2003 – Everything So Far (Kol'Mindi Hal Hadyia)
 2008 – Dashta D'Nineveh (Nineveh Plains)
 2016 – Nishmi (My Breath)
 2020 - Tarpa (Leaf)

Notes

References

External links
 Ashur Bet Sargis, entry at Last.fm
 Lyrics from AssyrianLyrics.com
 Music pearls of Beth-Nahrin: an Assyrian/Syriac discography, Abboud Zeitoune
 Ashur Bet-Sargis Finds Solace in Dashta D’Nineveh, Skokie.net
 آشور بت سركيس بين احضان الوطن, Zahrira.net
 تأملات في ألبوم آشور بت سركيس دشتا د نينوى, خابور كوم

Assyrian musicians
Assyrian nationalists
American people of Iraqi-Assyrian descent
Syriac-language singers
20th-century Iraqi male singers
Musicians from Baghdad
Iraqi Assyrian people
Living people
1949 births
Singers from Los Angeles
Iraqi emigrants to the United States
21st-century Iraqi male singers